Callimachus  ( Kallímakhos) was the Athenian polemarch at the Battle of Marathon, which took place during 490 BC. According to Herodotus he was from the Attica deme of Afidnes.

The Battle of Marathon 

As polemarch, Callimachus had a vote in military affairs along with the 10 strategoi, including Miltiades. Miltiades convinced Callimachus to vote in favour of a battle when the strategoi were split evenly on the matter.

Miltiades is supposed to have said to Callimachus just before the polemarch cast his vote: “Everything now rests on you.”

During the battle, as polemarch, Callimachus commanded the right wing of the Athenian army as was the Athenian custom at that time. The right and left wings (the left wing commanded by the Plataeans) surrounded the Persians after a seemingly suicidal charge by the centre line.

Although the Greeks were victorious, Callimachus was killed during the retreat of the Persians while he was chasing them to their ships.

Plutarch, in his work: Moralia. Greek and Roman Parallel Stories mentions that Callimachus was pierced with so many spears that, even when he was dead, he continued to be in an upright posture.

There was a custom at Athens that the father of the man who had the most valorous death in a battle should pronounce the funerary oration in public. So, after the battle of Marathon, the father of Callimachus and the father of Cynaegirus had an argument about who of their sons were the bravest.

Callimachus was portrayed among the Athenian gods and heroes on the wall‐paintings of the Stoa Poikile.  The Athenians erected a statue in honour of Callimachus, the "Nike of Callimachus".

According to some sources, before the battle, Callimachus promised that if the Greeks won, he would sacrifice to Artemis Agrotera as many goats as the number of Persians killed at the battlefield. Athenians kept his promise, in spirit, and every year sacrificed 500 goats, because they didn't have enough goats for every single Persian who was killed at the battle (6,400).

The statue of the "Nike of Callimachus" 

After the battle of Marathon, Athenians created a statue in honour of Callimachus. The statue was the "Nike of Callimachus" and it was erected next to the Parthenon (not the Parthenon that we can see today, but the previous temple which was destroyed by the Persians)  on the Acropolis of Athens.

The statue was severely damaged by the Persians when a decade later they conquered Athens and burned and destroyed the city. The statue depicts Nike (Victory), in the form of a woman with wings, on top of an inscribed column. Its height is 4.68 meters and was made of Parian marble. The head of the statue and parts of the torso and hands were never recovered.

On 26 October 2010, after the "Nike of Callimachus" was restored, it was displayed to the public for the first time as a complete monument at the Acropolis Museum. The statue has been affixed to a metal column that holds the various parts in place and is built so that additional fragments might be attached if they are found. The unveiling of the Nike monument was among a series of events scheduled during 2010 by the culture and tourism ministry of Greece to celebrate the 2,500th anniversary since the Battle of Marathon. In the Museum in front of the original statue there is also a copy showing how the statue looked like when it was whole and undamaged.

See also 
 First Persian invasion of Greece

References

Further reading 
 
 

490 BC deaths
5th-century BC Athenians
Ancient Greeks killed in battle
Athenians of the Greco-Persian Wars
Battle of Marathon
Year of birth unknown